Amy Lippman is an American television writer and producer.

Biography
In 1985, Lippman graduated from Harvard University.

She is perhaps best known as the co-creator of Party of Five with her writing partner, Christopher Keyser. She is politically conscious as a donor to Democratic candidates and causes. She also worked on the television series Sisters, In Treatment and the Party of Five spin-off Time of Your Life.

She is married to American actor, writer, director and producer Rodman Flender. Her son is Haskell Flender. Her nephew by marriage is Academy Award-nominated actor Timothée Chalamet.

Awards 
1995 Humanitas Prize for Party of Five with Christopher Keyser.

References

External links 

American television producers
American women television producers
American television writers
Living people
American women television writers
Writers Guild of America Award winners
Place of birth missing (living people)
Year of birth missing (living people)
Harvard University alumni
20th-century American screenwriters
20th-century American women writers
21st-century American screenwriters
21st-century American women writers